Jonas Nordin (born 1968) is a Swedish author and historian, and from October 2018 professor in History of books and Libraries at Lund University.

Biography
Nordin studied history at Stockholm University, and was awarded his Ph.D. in 2000 for his dissertation Ett fattigt men fritt folk. Nationell och politisk självbild i Sverige från sen stormaktstid till slutet av frihetstiden (English title: A poor but free people) (2000), an investigation of the public national and political orientation during Swedish "Great Power Era" (Stormaktstiden) and Age of Liberty (frihetstiden).

He became docent 2009 and from 1 October 2018 professor in History of books and Libraries at Lund University.

Nordin  has received the Swedish literary award Clio Prize (2003), and the Swedish Academy Gustavian Stipendium (Svenska Akademiens gustavianska stipendium) (2014).

Selected publications
Versailles: slottet, parken, livet, Norstedts, Stockholm 2013, 
Frihetstidens monarki. Konungamakt och offentlighet i 1700-talets Sverige, Atlantis, Stockholm 2009,  
Ett fattigt men fritt folk. Nationell och politisk självbild i Sverige från sen stormaktstid till slutet av frihetstiden, B. Östlings bokförl. Symposion, Eslöv 2000,

References 
 Biography, Royal Library (in Swedish)
Much of the content of this article comes from the equivalent Swedish-language Wikipedia article. Retrieved on 10 September 2018. Some of the following references are cited by that Swedish-language article:

External links
 Biography, Stockholm University (in Swedish)
 Biography, Royal Library (in Swedish)

1968 births
Living people
21st-century Swedish historians
Academic staff of Lund University
Stockholm University alumni